Reginald Lytilprowe (by 1491 – 1536/1537), of Norwich, Norfolk, was an English politician.

He was a Member of Parliament (MP) for Norwich in 1529 and mayor of the city in 1532–33.

References

15th-century births
1537 deaths
Politicians from Norwich
Mayors of Norwich
English MPs 1529–1536